Juve may refer to:

Sports clubs 
 Juve, the short name of Juventus F.C., association football club based in Turin, Italy; it can also refer to:
Juventus F.C. (women), women's team of Juventus F.C.
Juventus Next Gen, men's reserve team of Juventus F.C.
Juventus F.C. Youth Sector, youth system of Juventus F.C.
 Juve, a short name for other sports clubs named "Juventus"
 S.S. Juve Stabia, an Italian football club from Castellammare di Stabia, Campania
 JuveCaserta Basket, an Italian basketball club from Caserta, Campania
 FC Juve Maasmechelen, a Belgian football club from Maasmechelen, Limburg
 Juve Lis, a Portuguese handball club

People with the name 
 Arthur E. Juve (1901–1965), American chemical engineer
 Jørgen Juve (1906–1983), Norwegian football player, jurist, and writer
 Torger Juve (1840–?), American politician